John Woods may refer to:

Education
 John Woods (logician) (born 1937), Canadian professor of logic
 John Woods (oceanographer) (born 1939), British professor of oceanography
 John E. Woods (historian) (active since 1970), American professor of Iranian and Central Asian history
 John E. Woods (translator) (active since 1978), translator of literature from German to English

Entertainment
 John Joseph Woods (1849–1934), composer of music for national anthem of New Zealand
 Johnny Silvo (John Woods, 1936–2011), British folk and blues singer
 John Levene (born John Woods in 1941), British actor
 John Woods, a Scottish showman who exhibited the Tay Whale around Britain in the 1880s

Politics
 John Woods (Pennsylvania politician) (1761–1816), U.S. Representative from Pennsylvania
 John Woods (Ohio politician) (1794–1855), U.S. Representative from Ohio
 John M. Woods (1839–1927), American politician in Massachusetts
 John Woods (Australian politician) (1822–1892), Minister of Railways in colonial Victoria
 John Woods (Canadian politician) (1876–1957), in the Legislative Assembly of New Brunswick
 John Woods (civil servant) (1895–1962), British civil servant

Sports
 John Thomas Archer Woods (active 1895–1896), English cricketer and footballer
 John Woods (baseball) (1898–1946), MLB player for the Boston Red Sox
 John Woods (athlete) (born 1955), Irish long-distance runner
 John Woods (footballer) (active 1954–1967), Scottish-Canadian footballer
 John Woods (rugby league) (born 1956), English footballer 1970s–1990s, coached in the 1980s
 Jack Woods (rugby league) (1907–1965), English footballer in the 1930s

Other
 John Crawford Woods (1824–1906), Australian minister
 John Grieve Woods (1900–1980), Australian doctor and soldier
 John C. Woods (1911–1950), American executioner at the Nuremberg Trials

See also 
Jon Woods (born 1977), U.S. politician from Arkansas
John Wood (disambiguation)